The Zambia Red Cross Society was established in 1966 by an act of the Zambian Parliament. It had earlier started out as a branch of the British Red Cross. It has its headquarters in Lusaka.

External links
Official website
Official Red Cross Web Site

Red Cross and Red Crescent national societies
Organizations established in 1966
1966 establishments in Zambia
Medical and health organisations based in Zambia